The Cornell Big Red women's basketball team is the intercollegiate women's basketball program representing Cornell University. The school competes in the Ivy League in Division I of the National Collegiate Athletic Association (NCAA). The Big Red play home basketball games at the Newman Arena in Ithaca, New York on the university campus.

History
The Big Red have played at a varsity level since 1971, though Cornell had women play in class competitions before then. They started playing in the Ivy League in 1974. The Big Red played in only 7 games for the 1976–77 season due to being snowed in for days before the opener and a bus accident three weeks later that injured many of the players, which cancelled the season. Cornell has just one conference title (2008), winning a playoff with Dartmouth 64–47 to break the three way tie (Harvard being the other time) and winning the bid to the NCAA Tournament.

Postseason appearances
The Big Red have made the NCAA Division I women's basketball tournament once. They have a record of 0–1.

References

External links
 

 
1971 establishments in New York (state)